The Florida State University College of Social Work, is the social work school of the Florida State University. The College is the oldest in the state of Florida. About 917 students are enrolled, including undergraduates and graduate students, including Master of Social Work and Doctor of Philosophy-seeking students. All programs are accredited by the Council on Social Work Education.

National rankings
U.S. News & World Report (2020 edition)
 Social Work - 33rd overall

The College maintains relationships with more than 450 social service agencies throughout Florida, the U.S., and international placements; this also includes 18 Veteran Administration agencies.

Academic programs
In 2018, the College celebrated 100 years of social work/social welfare education at FSU. Academic programs are offered on campus, online, and at satellite locations.

The Bachelor of Social Work (BSW) Program is a nationally-accredited, limited-access program offered on FSU's main Tallahassee Campus and at the FSU Panama City Campus. Students pursuing this degree have the option to earn an MSW degree in one year through the College's advanced-standing program.

The Master of Social Work (MSW) Program offers on-campus programs including a Traditional MSW Program, Advanced Standing MSW Program (for those with a BSW degree), Part-Time MSW Program, and joint degree programs including MSW/MBA Program, MSW/JD Program, MSW/MPA Program, and MSW/MS in Criminology and Criminal Justice. The MSW program was the first in the U.S. to offer an online MSW, which now offers part-time Traditional MSW and Advanced-Standing Programs.

The College of Social Work Doctoral Program offers a Ph.D. with an emphasis on research methods and teaching. It is the program's mission to develop social work scholars and leaders in social work research and education who use systematic methods of inquiry and reasoned argument to advance knowledge.

Students and social work professionals also have access to Certificate Programs focusing on three specialized disciplines within the field of social work: Child Welfare Practice, Gerontology/Aging Studies, and Leadership in Executive and Administrative Development (LEAD) in Social Work.

Institutes and Centers 
The Florida Institute for Child Welfare (FICW) was established in 2014 by the Florida Legislature under Section 1004.615. Florida Statues. The FICW seeks to promote safety, permanency, and well-being among the children and families of Florida that are involved in the child welfare system. To accomplish this mission, the FICW sponsors and supports interdisciplinary research and program evaluation initiatives that will contribute to a dynamic knowledge base relevant to enhancing Florida's child welfare outcomes. (http://ficw.fsu.edu/) 

The Center for the Study and Promotion of Communities, Families, and Children (The Center) was created in 2017 to generate and sustain transformational knowledge development for effective policies, services, and usable research for the promotion of the communities, families, and children of Florida, the nation, and across the globe. Housed under The Center are the Institute for Family Violence Studies and the Multidisciplinary Evaluation and Consulting Center.
 The Florida Institute for Family Violence Studies (IFVS) is funded by multiple national, state, and private entities. IFVS is home to large multidisciplinary research and service projects that involve social services, policy, and legal issues. Projects include the Clearinghouse on Supervised Visitation, Successful Co-parenting after Divorce, and the Law Enforcement Families Partnership. (http://familyvio.csw.fsu.edu/) 
 The Multidisciplinary Evaluation and Consulting Center (MDC) serves pre-school and school-aged children experiencing severe and/or complex academic, medical, and/or behavioral/emotional problems. Children and their families are referred by twenty school districts in the Florida Panhandle, Children's Medical Services, and other state and community agencies. The MDC offers training placements through its ADA accredited Doctoral Psychology Internship program and provides internships for doctoral students in clinical, school and counseling psychology. (http://mdc.fsu.edu)

International programs
The College of Social Work offers a summer study abroad program in Prague, Czech Republic and two exchange programs during the fall and spring semester in Australia and Sweden. The College also offers an Alternative Spring Break program opportunity for students to participate in a volunteer service project in an international setting. International field placements opportunities are also available for undergraduate and graduate in London, England, United Kingdom; Dublin, Ireland; Belfast, Northern Ireland, United Kingdom; Grenada, West Indies; and, Vancouver, British Columbia, Canada.

References

External links

Master of social work

 
Educational institutions established in 1928
Schools of social work in the United States
1928 establishments in Florida